Alessandro Sforza (21 October 1409 – 3 April 1473) was an Italian condottiero and lord of Pesaro, the first of the Pesaro line of the Sforza family.

Biography
He was born in Cotignola in 1409, an illegitimate son of the famous condottiero Muzio Attendolo Sforza.

Alessandro collaborated actively with his brother Francesco in his military campaign, and with him he conquered Milan, Alessandria and Pesaro. In 1435, at Fiordimonte, he won the battle in which the riotous Niccolò Fortebraccio was killed. In 1442 at Assisi he commanded the troops besieged by Pope Eugene IV's condottiero Francesco Piccinino. He was forced to leave the city, abandoning the city to ravages and massacres. In 1444 he obtained the lordship of Pesaro by Galeazzo Malatesta. Here he enlarged the Ducal Palace to conform it to the Renaissance standards.

During the Wars in Lombardy in support of Francesco he presided Parma and, in February 1446, he proclaimed himself lord of the city. After Francesco's conquest of the Duchy of Milan, the Peace of Lodi (1454) confirmed him in Parma.

In 1464 he obtained by Pope Pius II the seigniory of Gradara, which he defended by the Malatesta attempts of reconquest.

He died in 1473 from an attack of apoplexy. His son Costanzo succeeded him in Pesaro.

Family
He married Costanza Varano (1428–1447), the daughter of Pietro Gentile I da Varano, on 8 December 1444. She died while bearing Costanzo. The following year he married Sveva da Montefeltro (1434–1478), daughter of Guidantonio da Montefeltro, count of Urbino. In 1457, fearing a possible conjure of the Malatesta family to regain the seigniory of Pesaro, he obliged her to become a nun in a monastery in the city.

By Costanza he had two children, Battista (1446–1472), who became the wife of Federico III of Urbino, and Costanzo.

He also had an illegitimate daughter, Ginevra (c. 1440–1507), known as a patron of the visual and literary arts. She married Sante Bentivoglio in 1454 and, after his death, Giovanni II Bentivoglio, duke of Bologna.

Notes

1409 births
1473 deaths
People from the Province of Ravenna
Alessandro
15th-century condottieri
Lords of Pesaro